Elections to Colchester Borough Council were held in May 1991. These were on the same day as other Local elections across England and Wales.

Summary

Ward results

Berechurch

Boxted & Langham

No Labour candidate as previous (13.7%).

Castle

Great & Little Horkesley

Great Tey

Harbour

Lexden

Mile End

New Town

Prettygate

Shrub End

St. Andrew's

St. Anne's

St. John's

St. Mary's

Stanway

Tiptree

West Bergholt & Eight Ash Green

West Mersea

Wivenhoe

References

1991
1991 English local elections
1990s in Essex